Sita Maria Dias Valles (Cabinda, 23 August 1951 – Luanda, c. 1 August 1977) was a paramilitary, doctor and member of the Portuguese Communist Party, in charge of the União dos Estudantes Comunistas (or Communist Students' League). She was executed following the events of May 1977, presumably in August 1977 in Luanda, Angola.

Early life

Born in Luanda in 1951, Sita Valles was the daughter of Edgar Francisco da Purificação Valles, a government agronomist, and Maria Lúcia Aida Florinda Dias Valles, a housewife, a prosperous Goan Catholic couple based in what was then Portuguese-ruled Angola.

Seen in her time as pretty, intelligent and charming, she was also bold and independent, according to her biographers. She rejected her Catholic upbringing and began her political activity on joining the Faculty of Medicine of Luanda, where she associated with Maoist groups.

Reviewer Adolfo Mascarenhas describes her from a photograph he encountered in her 2018 English-language biography: "...there she was, more standing than leaning on a Morris Minor sedan of the 1950’s, tallish, determined jaw, crossed legs, a shortish white skirt topped by a polar necked long sleeved blouse."

When she continued her studies in Lisbon, from 1971, she became part of the network of Communist militants and in the União dos Estudantes Comunistas. There, she would grow into one of Portuguese Communism's most prominent figures next only to Zita Seabra.

Role following the Carnation Revolution

At the time of the Carnation Revolution of April 25, 1974, which also erupted in Angola following the overthrow of the Marcello Caetano's government in Portugal, Valles was participating in a congress in Moscow. She decided to return to Angola in the summer of 1975 to participate in the revolution.

In Luanda she was considered to be part of the ideologically more-orthodox wing of the People's Movement for the Liberation of Angola (MPLA), seen as pro-Soviet, which was directed by Nito Alves and José Van-Dunem. By 1976, Alves was the new MPLA government's interior minister while Van-Dunem, an ex-political prisoner, was a key political commissar in the army. Sita Valles became "a leading functionary in the government’s Department of Mass Organization". Valles married Van-Dunem in 1977 and had a son with him, born on February 18, 1977.

Death

Following Angola's independence, Alves took the helm of a new political movement within the People's Movement for the Liberation of Angola known as Fraccionismo; this movement had ruled the country since the independence of Angola. This movement surfaced as a difference of opinion that arose in the very heart of the MPLA after the independence of Angola, from President Agostinho Neto. It was very critical of Neto's inner circle, accusing some of its members of illicit enrichment and corruption. 

In Luanda, an attempted coup d'etat was launched on 27 May 1977. The attempt was foiled due to the support of the Cuban Revolutionary Armed Forces, then stationed in Angola. Alves, van Dunem and Valles were deposed from their official positions. The attempted coup was followed by a period of two years of bloody pursuit of (real and supposed) followers and sympathizers of Nito Alves leading to tens of thousands of killings.

Valles and her husband were among those killed during this period. She was accused of being one of the brains of the alleged putsch of 27 May 1977, tried in secret and found guilty.

According to her biographer Leonor Figueiredo, Sita Valles was executed by a firing squad at 5 a.m. on August 1, 1977. Her execution was preceded by her abject torture and rape by men of the Angola Information and Security Directorate (DISA), the regime's political police. It is said she refused being blindfolded, facing her death with extreme heroicity. A tractor flattened the ground of the ditch where her corpse was buried so that it would not be found.

Aftermath
In September 2020, the BBC carried an interview with João Ernesto Van Dunem (the son of Sita Valles) in the Newshour Sounds programme titled "My parents were killed in Angola's secret massacre". 

Following the English translation of a biography on her life in 2018, there has been an interest about her life in her parents' native Goa.

Biographies and studies

 Leonor Figueiredo, Sita Valles: Revolucionária, Comunista até à Morte (Alêtheia Editores, 2014) [translated as Sita Valles: A Revolutionary until Death by David Addison Smith (Goa 1556, 2018). The Portuguese author, a journalist since 1981, formerly with the Correio da Manhã till the end of the 1980s, and then for 21 years on the editorial board of the Diário de Notícias till January 2009.
 Leonor Figueiredo, Secret Files of the Decolonization of Angola (Alêtheia Editores, 2009). This study investigated, gathered evidences, and looked for decades-old memories of Valles, José Van-Dunem, Nito Alves and an unknown number of victims which is believed to have probably exceeded 20,000. The study records a brutal history which had grown into a myth for a generation.

References

External links 
Purga em Angola, by Dalila Cabrita Mateus
 Biografia de Sita Valles revela mulher que morreu de olhos abertos perante pelotão de fuzilamento
 Sita Vales, protagonista do “27 de Maio” – In memorium 
 A revolução perdida de Sita Valles
 Zita Seabra on Sita Valles
 Para além da morte trágica de Sita Valles (publico.pt)
 Sita Valles, on Gini.com
 Link to book on the publisher's website

Angolan communists
Anti-revisionists
1977 deaths
1951 births